The 2019 B&L Transport 170 is a NASCAR Xfinity Series race held on August 10, 2019, at Mid-Ohio Sports Car Course in Lexington, Ohio. Contested over 75 laps on the  road course, it was the 21st race of the 2019 NASCAR Xfinity Series season.

Background

Track

The track is a road course auto racing facility located in Troy Township, Morrow County, Ohio, United States, just outside the village of Lexington. Mid-Ohio has also colloquially become a term for the entire north-central region of the state, from south of Sandusky to the north of Columbus.

The track opened as a 15-turn, 2.4 mile (3.86 km) road circuit run clockwise. The back portion of the track allows speeds approaching . A separate starting line is located on the backstretch to allow for safer rolling starts. The regular start / finish line is located on the pit straight. There is grandstand seating for 10,000 spectators and three observation mounds alongside the track raise the capacity to over 75,000.

Entry list

Practice

First practice

Final practice

Qualifying

Qualifying results

Race

Summary
Austin Cindric started on pole and dominated Stage 1 despite Ray Black Jr. causing a caution on lap 4 for stalling and Jack Hawksworth spinning on the frontstretch. Cindric pitted with two laps remaining in the stage, giving the Stage 1 win to Chase Briscoe. On lap 28, Brandon Brown spun into a sand pit and got stuck. In the restart, Chris Dyson ran into Cole Custer, heavily damaging Dyson's car and forcing him to leave the race. For the next restart, Justin Allgaier and Noah Gragson spun simultaneously and collected numerous cars before Stephen Leicht lost a wheel and ended up ripping the door off David Starr's car. Hawksworth managed to win Stage 2 in his first NASCAR start.

Scott Heckert went off-course and crashed into the tire wall with 19 laps remaining. Briscoe, Regan Smith, and Will Rodgers  stayed out while the leaders pitted. When the green flag waved, Briscoe quickly passed Smith but was soon caught by Cindric and Christopher Bell. Cindric soon pulled away, and ultimately took the win with a 3 second lead over Bell.

Stage Results

Stage One
Laps: 20

Stage Two
Laps: 20

Final Stage Results

Stage Three
Laps: 35

References

2019 in sports in Ohio
BandL Transport 170
NASCAR races at Mid-Ohio Sports Car Course
2019 NASCAR Xfinity Series